Rolf Olsen (26 December 1919 – 3 April 1998) was an Austrian actor, screenwriter and film director. He appeared in 60 films between 1949 and 1990. He also wrote for 51 films and directed a further 33 between 1947 and 1990. He was born in Vienna, Austria and died in Munich, Germany.

Selected filmography

 The Three from the Filling Station (1955 – actor)
 My Aunt, Your Aunt (1956)
 Bonjour Kathrin (1956 – actor)
 Emperor's Ball (1956 – actor)
 War of the Maidens (1957)
 Love, Girls and Soldiers (1958)
 Girls for the Mambo-Bar (1959)
 Mikosch, the Pride of the Company (1959 – actor)
 Crime Tango (1960)
 Big Request Concert (1960 – writer, actor)
 Queen of the Pirates (1960 – writer)
 Our Crazy Aunts (1961)
 The Turkish Cucumbers (1962)
 No Kissing Under Water (1962)
 The Sweet Life of Count Bobby (1962)
 Our Crazy Nieces (1963)
 Our Crazy Aunts in the South Seas (1964)
 The Last Ride to Santa Cruz (1964 – director)
 Legend of a Gunfighter (1964 – director)
 Call of the Forest (1965)
 Once a Greek (1966)
 Killer's Carnival (1966 – writer)
 Blood at Sundown (1966 – writer)
 When Night Falls on the Reeperbahn (1967 - Director)
 The Doctor of St. Pauli (1968 – director)
 On the Reeperbahn at Half Past Midnight (1969 – director)
 The Young Tigers of Hong Kong (1969 - writer)
 When You're With Me (1970)
 That Can't Shake Our Willi! (1970 – director)
 Hotel by the Hour (1970 – director)
 The Priest of St. Pauli (1970 – director)
 Cry of the Black Wolves (1972 - writer)
 Bloody Friday (1972 – director)
 Shocking Asia (1974 – writer)
 Love Hotel in Tyrol (1978)
 Shocking Asia II: The Last Taboos (1985 – writer)

References

External links

1919 births
1998 deaths
Austrian male film actors
Film people from Vienna
Deaths from cancer in Germany
Male actors from Vienna
20th-century Austrian male actors